Novak Djokovic defeated Sebastian Korda in the final, 6–7(8–10), 7–6(7–3), 6–4 to win the men's singles title at the 2023 Adelaide International 1. He saved a championship point en route to his 92nd ATP Tour singles title, equaling Rafael Nadal's tally for the fourth-most men's singles titles in the Open Era.

Gaël Monfils was the reigning champion, but chose not to participate this year.

Seeds

Draw

Finals

Top half

Bottom half

Qualifying

Seeds

Qualifiers

Qualifying draw

First qualifier

Second qualifier

Third qualifier

Fourth qualifier

References

External links 
 Main draw
 Qualifying draw

2023 Adelaide International 1
2023 ATP Tour